USNS PFC Dewayne T. Williams (T-AK-3009) , (former MV PFC Dewayne T. Williams (AK-3009)), is the second ship of the 2nd Lt. John P. Bobo-class cargo ship and one of the maritime prepositioning ships of the US Navy. She is named after Medal of Honor recipient and US Marine Dewayne T. Williams.

Construction and career 
She was built by General Dynamics Quincy Shipbuilding Division, Quincy, Massachusetts, and acquired by the Navy under a long-term charter from 6 June 1985. The navy placed her under the direction of the Military Sealift Command as MV PFC Dewayne T. Williams (AK-3009), and assigned to be operated by American Overseas Marine Corporation.

She was purchased outright by Military Sealift Command on 17 January 2006, and was redesignated USNS PFC Dewayne T. Williams (T-AK-3009). She was one of the ships assigned to Maritime Prepositioning Program Squadron 1 under the operational control of MSC Europe, operating in the Mediterranean.

Gallery

References 

1985 ships
2nd Lt John P. Bobo-class dry cargo ship
Merchant ships of the United States
Cargo ships of the United States Navy
Container ships of the United States Navy
Ships built in Quincy, Massachusetts
Gulf War ships of the United States